Goose Lake may refer to:

Canada

Lakes
Goose Lake (Cape Breton), Nova Scotia
Goose Lakes, Halifax, Nova Scotia
Goose Lake (Argyle), Nova Scotia
Goose Lake (Barrington), Nova Scotia
Goose Lake (District of Chester), Nova Scotia
Goose Lake (Cumberland), Nova Scotia
Goose Lake (Guysborough), Nova Scotia
East Goose Lake, Nova Scotia

Other places
Goose Lake, Alberta, aka Lone Pine, a hamlet

Russia
Lake Gusinoye (Goose Lake), Buryatia, Russia

United States

Lakes
Goose Lake (Anchorage), Alaska
Goose Lake (Oregon–California)
Goose Lake (Clinton County, Iowa)
Goose Lake (Marquette County, Michigan)
Goose Lake (South Dakota)
Goose Lake (Washington)

Other places
Goose Lake, Iowa, a town
Goose Lake Township, Grundy County, Illinois
Goose Lake Valley, a valley in Oregon
Goose Lake National Forest, Oregon
Goose Lake State Recreation Area, Oregon
Goose Lake Prairie State Natural Area, Illinois

See also
Anderson Goose Lake, Iowa
Goose Harbour Lake, Nova Scotia
Goose Lake meteorite
Goose Pond (disambiguation)
Mother Goose Lake, Alaska